Pelecanus tirarensis is a fossil pelican described from several fragmentary tarsometatarsi from Late Oligocene to Middle Miocene deposits in the Namba Formation of Lake Pinpa in the Lake Eyre Basin of north-eastern South Australia.

References

Pelecanus
Miocene birds
Fossil taxa described in 1966
Prehistoric birds of Australia